Perseba stands for Persatuan Sepakbola Bangkalan (en: Football Association of Bangkalan). Perseba Bangkalan is an Indonesian football club based in Bangkalan Regency, Madura Island, East Java. They currently compete in the Liga 3.

Honours
Liga Indonesia Third Division (1): 2013

References

External links
Liga-Indonesia.co.id
 

Football clubs in Indonesia
Football clubs in East Java
Association football clubs established in 1970
1970 establishments in Indonesia